The Saudi Fund for Development (SFD) is a Saudi Arabian government agency that provides development assistance to developing countries by financing social and infrastructure projects with the aim of improving lives and communities, which leads to supporting the economies of recipient countries by enhancing growth and job opportunities.  SFD was established in 1974 and began operations in 1975. SFD's activities include development, finance, trade and funding.
SFD is led by H.E. Mr. Ahmed bin Aqeel Al-khateeb who is the Chairman of the Board of Directors and Minister of Tourism for Saudi Arabia. Dr. Khalid S. Alkhudairy is the Chief Executive Officer (CEO) of SFD.

History
SFD was established in 1974, it has financed infrastructure programs (dams, transport) and vital social projects (healthcare facilities; Water, Sanitation and Health (WASH) programs and education) alongside other sectors such as energy and agriculture.

Funding
SFD’s capital now amounts to Saudi Arabian Riyals (SAR) 31 billion  (US $8.3 billion), from an initial investment of SAR 10 billion  (US $2.6 billion).
SFD has contributed official development assistance (ODA) to 1000 projects in 85 countries through loan and grant mechanisms. 
In 2017, SFD was responsible for 43.9% of ODA dispersed by Saudi government agencies. SFD delivers funding bi-laterally; however, it is also engaged in the multilateral development system and works with organizations such as such as the United Nations, the World Bank , Arab Fund for Economic and Social Development, Arab Bank for Economic Development in Africa, Islamic Development Bank, OPEC Fund for International Development, French Development Agency and the United Kingdom’s Department for International Development (DFID). 
SFD’s funding is multiregional and provides development assistance to all developing countries, although it prioritizes the least developed and low-income countries.  According to the World Bank, SFD is one of the most global of Arab international development funds, financing projects in Europe and South America, alongside other regions.

Official development assistance
In 2014, Saudi Arabia’s gross ODA amounted to SAR 54 billion (US $14.4 billion), which represented 1.90% of the Kingdom’s Gross National Income (GNI), which far exceeded the agreed international 0.70% ODA/GNI target.
In the same year, Saudi Arabia ranked higher in contributions than 28 other DAC member countries including the United Kingdom (0.70%), and the US (0.19%). 
Saudi Arabia became a Development Assistance Committee (DAC) Participant of the Organization for Economic Cooperation and Development (OECD) in 2018 and began reporting its ODA contributions that same year. Saudi Arabia is one of the largest providers in terms of volume, with increasing levels of ODA.
As of 2020, Saudi Arabia has been ranked fifth globally, and first in the Arab world, for its provision of humanitarian aid. According to the UN Financial Tracking Service platform, Saudi Arabia contributed SAR 4.8 billion (US $1.2 billion) or 5.5% of the total amount of international spending on relief programs.

Multi-country programs
Since its founding in 1974, SFD’s methodology has been to assess the critical needs of partner nations - whether those be in energy, water, transportation or other principal development areas - and work to finance projects that address a particular need, in line with the UN Sustainable Development Goals.
In response to the COVID-19 pandemic, SFD, as a member of the Arab Coordination Group, will contribute funding to help developing countries economically recover from the recession caused by the pandemic. Collectively, the Arab Coordination Group has committed SAR 375 billion (US $10 billion) to this effort.

Reducing isolation in landlocked countries
SFD has supported transportation and infrastructure projects designed to reduce social and economic isolation in landlocked African countries. The lack of infrastructure and connectivity between such countries has led to a reduction in exports, as transport costs are estimated to comprise about 77% of the value of exports.  This has had a significant impact on landlocked countries’ abilities to trade with their neighbours. 
To combat this, SFD has contributed to the financing of a number of internal and external road projects in Burkina Faso, Ethiopia, Niger, Mali and Chad, linking them to seaports in Djibouti, Ghana and Mauritania. Due to their geographical location, the countries have experienced significant social and economic challenges; the development of the roads and transportation links is expected to enhance trade and connectivity in the region, with the potential to generate jobs and increase business opportunities for small and medium sized enterprises (SMEs).

Saudi program for wells and rural development in Africa
SFD established this program to mitigate the effects of drought in rural regions in several African countries. Under the program, over 6,000 water facilities have been equipped, and 2.5 million people have secured improved access to water.

Partnerships and multi-lateral official development assistance
SFD continues to partner with organizations such as the United Nations,  the World Bank, the United Kingdom’s Department for International Development (DFID), Agence française de développement (AFD) and Japan International Cooperation Agency (JICA), United Nations International Children's Fund (UNICEF) and the United Nations High Commissioner for Refugees (UNHCR).

SFD also collaborates with regional development partners such as the Islamic Development Bank (IsDB), Arab Bank for Economic Development in Africa BADEA), the Abu Dhabi Fund for Development (ADFD),  the Kuwait Fund for Arab Economic Development (FKDEA), the OPEC Fund for International Development (OFID), the ECOWAS Investment and Development Bank (EBID) and the West African Development Bank (BOAD) .

United Nations High Commissioner for Refugees (UNHCR)
Saudi Arabia, via SFD, is a leading donor to UNHCR globally. SFD has provided more than SAR 200 million (US $54 million) to 11 UNHCR projects. According to the UNHCR, Saudi contributions have enabled a continued humanitarian response in the Middle East and other regions, particularly to those affected by the Yemen, Syria, Afghanistan, and Rohingya crisis.

SFD has supported the UNHCR’s humanitarian efforts in refugee camps, such as the Al-Azraq Camp in Jordan. SFD has provided SAR 34.5 million (US $9.2 million) to two projects to support the construction of an electrical network system in the camp.  Implemented in two phases, the electrical network will connect all shelters, plot lighting, markets and various public spaces in the Al- Azraq camp to the electrical grid, improving access to electricity for more than 25,000 Syrian refugees living in the camp.

United Nations Relief and Works Agency (UNRWA) for Palestine refugees in the near east
SFD has a long-standing legacy of supporting Palestinians and the Palestinian cause through UNRWA projects. In 2019, Saudi Arabia, through SFD, was recognised as one of the top three largest donors to UNRWA and has donated SAR 3 billion (US $800 million) to the agency since 1994.

To date, SFD has contributed to 34 UNRWA programs and projects in support of Palestinians, such as large-scale maintenance projects that will ensure that 268 schools and health centres in Syria, Jordan, Gaza, Lebanon and the West Bank, including East Jerusalem are structurally sound. 
These projects include support to maintain Palestinian refugee camps in different countries in the Middle East such as the UNRWA Al-Safsaf School in Dera’a refugee camp in Syria, which was inaugurated in 2020. 
SFD’s funding has also contributed to the renovation of schools in the West Bank, where 46,000 Palestinian refugee children were educated in the 2019-2020 academic year at 96 schools run by the UNRWA.

United Nations Development Programme (UNDP)
SFD has partnered with the UNDP on several projects in the Gaza Strip to provide housing that benefits approximately 13,466 families from the region.  In February 2020, SFD signed an additional SAR 37.5 million (US $10 million) agreement with UNDP and UNRWA to fund the repair and reconstruction of houses in the Gaza Strip. This fourth amendment brings the total SFD contribution to SAR 306 million (US $81.5 million).
SFD’s partnership with the United Nations Development Programme (UNDP) is crucial to improving sustainable development in Pakistan. SFD has provided SAR 43.7 million (US $11.6 million) to the UNDP to develop the infrastructure of the Swat district in Pakistan.

As a result of the funds provided by SFD, more than 800,000 people in the Swat district of Khyber Pakhtunkhwa province stand to benefit from the restoration of 639 ongoing basic community infrastructure schemes.

United Nations International Children's Fund (UNICEF)
UNICEF has recognized Saudi Arabia for its generous support for UNICEF, stating it had contributed significantly to development projects that benefit millions of children around the world. SFD has supported UNICEF with SAR 86 million (US $23 million) for education, health, nutrition and water and sanitation services in Pakistan. This has culminated in the development of schools in the Swat Valley region of Pakistan.

Areas of geographical cooperation
SFD is one of Africa’s largest contributors to sustainable development aid, and since 1975 has contributed SAR 38 billion (US $10 billion) in financial assistance to more than 400 development projects in 46 African countries. SFD has worked on several cross-border projects, such as the Tadjoura Port, in Djibouti, and the development of transport links in West and Central Africa. Other African countries include Burkina Faso, Burundi, Comoros Islands, Chad, Djibouti, Egypt, Ethiopia, Gambia, Kenya, Liberia, Mauritius, Mauritania, Morocco, Sudan and Tunisia.
In 2019, SFD signed two loans worth SAR 367 million (US $97.8 million) to finance the construction of roads and schools in Afghanistan. SFD also works with countries in Asia such as Bahrain, Jordan, Maldives, Nepal, Kyrgyzstan, Republic of Uzbekistan and Sri Lanka.
To date SFD has contributed SAR 1.5 billion (US $411 million) in financial assistance to more than 21 countries in Europe, South America and the Caribbean. SFD is financing and supporting infrastructure projects in European countries such as Albania, Bosnia and Herzegovina, Republic of Kosovo alongside projects in South American and Caribbean countries including Brazil, Cuba and Jamaica.

References

1974 establishments in Saudi Arabia
Government agencies of Saudi Arabia